Riverside High School (RVHS) is a public secondary school in the Leesburg subdivision Lansdowne, Virginia, a community in Loudoun County, Virginia. The school is part of Loudoun County Public Schools.

History

Riverside opened in 2015, with its student body coming from Belmont Ridge Middle School, Stone Bridge High School, Broad Run High School, and Tuscarora High School. The school's capacity is 1,800 students.

Academics

Accreditation
Riverside High School is fully accredited based on its performance on the Standards of Learning tests in Virginia since its opening in 2015.

Demographics

Riverside High School is home to white students, African-American students, and Asian students of varying origin.

Fine arts
Riverside is a blue ribbon school after obtaining all superiors at the 2017 District Assessments.

Band
The Riverside Marching Rams won the Group 1A Virginia State Championship in 2017, at the USBands Virginia State Championship. The Riverside Marching Rams won the Group 2A Virginia State Championship and placed second overall in 2018.
{| class="wikitable" width=350px
|+
!colspan=7 align=center bgcolor=""|Marching Assessments
|-
!align=center| Year
!align=center| Show Name
!align=center| Rating
|-
|2015
| Rise of the Ram
| Excellent
|-
|2016
| Arabian Dreams
| Excellent
|-
|2017
| Portraits of Jazz
| Excellent
|-
|2018
| Adventure Awaits
| Superior
|-
|2019
| The Grid
|-
|2020
|
|-
|2021
| A Million Dreams
|-
|2022
| Separate Ways
|}

Extracurricular activities

Riverside's DECA program won first place at the 2016 DECA International Career Development Conference (School-Based Enterprise Retail Operations).

Athletics
The school's mascot is a ram and the sports teams play in the 5 A Potomac District.  The Rams' athletic teams have won state and regional championships.

Riverside has won 12 state titles, which are:
Two AAA titles for Varsity Competition Cheer in 2016, 2021
One AAA title for Varsity Girls Swimming in 2017
One AAA title for Varsity Boys Soccer in 2017
Four AAAA titles for Varsity Boys Lacrosse in 2017, 2018, 2021, 2022
One AAAA title for Varsity Girls Lacrosse in 2018
One AAAA title for Boys Tennis in 2018
One AAAA title for Boys Lacrosse in 2019
One AAAA title of Varsity Boys Swimming in 2022

State championships

{| class="wikitable" width=650px
|+
!colspan=7 align=center bgcolor=""|Cheerleading State Championships
|-
!align=center| Year
!colspan=2 align=center| Winning Team
!colspan=2 align=center| Runner-Up
!align=center| Class
|-
|2016
| Riverside
| 272.50
| Cave Spring 
| 257.00
| AAA
|-
|}
{| class="wikitable" width=650px
|+
! colspan="7" align="center" bgcolor |Girls Swimming State Championships
|-
!align=center| Year
!colspan=2 align=center| Winning Team
!colspan=2 align=center| Runner-Up
!align=center| Class
|-
|2017
| Riverside
| 40
| Blacksburg
| 34
| AAA
|-
|}

On Friday, September 9, 2022, the Riverside varsity football team ended a 15-game losing streak lasting parts of 3 seasons with a 28-15 home victory over Brooke Point High School.

References

Public high schools in Virginia
Schools in Loudoun County, Virginia
Leesburg, Virginia
Educational institutions established in 2015
2015 establishments in Virginia